Bid Zardi (also Romanized as Bīd Zardī; also known as Bīd Zard) is a village in Mishan Rural District, Mahvarmilani District, Mamasani County, Fars Province, Iran. At the 2006 census, its population was 52, in 13 families.

References 

Populated places in Mamasani County